Colombia has 28.1 Megawatt installed capacity of renewable energy (excluding large hydropower), consisting mainly of wind power. This supplies 1% of the country's needs. The country has significant wind and solar resources that remain largely unexploited. According to a study by the World Bank’s Energy Sector Management Assistance Program (ESMAP), exploitation of the country’s significant wind potential alone could cover more than the country’s current total energy needs.

Investment costs 

Investment costs for renewable energy technologies in Colombia were estimated in 2005 as follows:

Hydropower 

With 70 percent of the country’s power generation, hydropower is a very important national energy source. The total large hydropower potential for Colombia is estimated at 93GW, with an additional 25GW of small hydropower (<20MW)

Wind 

The wind regime in Colombia is among the best in South America. Offshore regions of the northern part of Colombia, such as in the Guajira Department, have been classified with class 7 winds (over 10 meters per second (m/s)). The only other region in Latin America with such high wind power classification is the Patagonia region of Chile and Argentina.

Colombia has an estimated theoretical wind power potential of 21 GW just in the Guajira Department—enough to generate sufficient power to meet the national demand almost twice over. However, the country only has an installed capacity of 19.5 MW of wind energy, tapping only 0.4% of its theoretical wind potential. This capacity is concentrated in a single project, the Jepírachi Wind Project, developed by Empresas Públicas de Medellín (EPM) under a Carbon Finance mechanism arranged by the World Bank. There are several projects under consideration, including a 200 MW project in Ipapure.

In the first renewable energy auction for the country, over 1 GW of wind power was awarded in 2019 for a 15-year power purchase agreement from 2022.

Solar 

Colombia has significant solar power resources because of its location in the equatorial zone, but the country sits in a complex region of the Andes where climatic conditions vary. The daily average radiation is 4.5 kWh/m2, and the area with the best solar resource is the Guajira Peninsula, with 6 kWh/m2 of radiation. Of the 6 MW of solar power installed in Colombia (equivalent to about 78,000 average-size solar panels), 57 percent is distributed in rural applications and 43 percent in communication towers and road signaling. Solar systems can be very suitable for applications in rural areas, where energy demands are dispersed and modest and grid connection is often more costly (UPME 2005).

Geothermal 

The former Colombian Institute of Electrical Energy, today IPSE, and the Latin American Energy Organization have identified three areas with geothermal power potential:
 Azufral, in Nariño Department, where the Azufral Volcano is located;
 Cerro Negro-Tufiño, also in Nariño Department, near the Chiles Volcano; and
 Paipa, located in the Cordillera Oriental in Boyacá Department.

The potential of the main sources of geothermal power in Colombia is summarized below:

Biomass 

Colombia has a great biomass power potential from agricultural residues (banana, coffee pulp, and animal waste). Its annual biomass power potential is estimated to be over 16 GWh, which is still less than 0.1% of current electricity production. The potential is distributed as follows:

 11,828 MWh/yr from agriculture residues
 2,640 MWh/yr from bioethanol
 698 MWh/yr from natural forest residues
 658 MWh/yr from biodiesel
 442 MWh/yr from planted forest residues

The region of Urabá in the north of the Department of Antioquia has approximately 19,000 hectares of banana plantations, producing more than 1 million tons annually. It has also been estimated that approximately 85,000 TOE/yr could be produced from the 190 million m3/yr of biogas generated from coffee plantations, equivalent to 995,000 MWh.
 
In addition, the landfills in the four main cities in Colombia (Bogotá, Medellín, Cali, and Barranquilla) are estimated to have the potential to provide for an installed capacity of 47 MW (0.3% of current installed capacity).

References

External links

 Biotec International